The Vatican Observatory is an astronomical research and educational institution supported by the Holy See. Originally based in the Roman College of Rome, the Observatory is now headquartered in Castel Gandolfo, Italy and operates a telescope at the Mount Graham International Observatory in the United States.

The Director of the Observatory is Brother Guy Consolmagno, an American Jesuit. In 2008, the Templeton Prize was awarded to cosmologist Fr. Michał Heller, a Vatican Observatory Adjunct Scholar. In 2010, the George Van Biesbroeck Prize was awarded to former observatory director, the American Jesuit, Fr. George Coyne.

History

The Church has had a long-standing interest in astronomy, due to the astronomical basis of the calendar by which holy days and Easter are determined. For instance, the Gregorian Calendar, promulgated in 1582 by Pope Gregory XIII, was developed by Aloysius Lilius and later modified by Christoph Clavius at the Collegio Romano from astronomical data. The Gregorian Tower was completed in 1580 for his purpose, designed by Bolognese architect Ottaviano Nonni.

In the 18th century, the Papacy actively supported astronomy, establishing the Observatory of the Roman College in 1774. In 1787–1789, the Specola Vaticana in the Tower of the Winds within the Vatican was established under the direction of Msgr. Filippo Luigi Gilii (1756–1821). When Msgr. Gilii died, the Specola was closed down because it was inconvenient for students in the city because the dome of St. Peter's obstructed its view. Its instruments were transferred to the College Observatory. A third facility, the Observatory of the Capitol, was operated from 1827 to 1870.

Father Angelo Secchi SJ relocated the College Observatory to the top of Sant'Ignazio di Loyola a Campo Marzio (Church of St. Ignatius in Rome). In 1870, with the capture of Rome, the College Observatory fell into the hands of the Italian Government. Out of respect for his work, however, Father Secchi was permitted to continue using the Observatory. After Secchi's death in 1878 the Observatory was nationalized by the Italian government and renamed the Regio Osservatorio al Collegio Romano ("Royal Observatory at the Roman College"), ending astronomical research in the Vatican.

In 1891, however, Pope Leo XIII issued a Motu proprio re-founding the Specola Vaticana (Vatican Observatory) and a new observatory was built on the walls at the edge of the Vatican. The new Vatican Observatory remained there for the next forty years.

In the late nineteenth-century the Vatican Observatory was part of a group of top astronomy institutions from around the world which worked together to create a photographic "Celestial Map" ("Carte du Ciel") and an "astrographic" catalog pinpointing the stars' positions. Italian astronomer Father Francesco Denza led the Vatican's contribution to the project until his death in 1894. In the early twentieth-century Father John Hagen took over the project and recruited a group of nuns from the Sisters of the Holy Child Mary to work on the necessary recording and calculations. The sisters were Sisters Emilia Ponzoni, Regina Colombo, Concetta Finardi and Luigia Panceri.

By the 1930s, the smoke and sky-glow of the city had made it impossible to conduct useful observations in Rome. By 1961, the same problems with light pollution made observing difficult at Castel Gandolfo. The Observatory then established the Vatican Observatory Research Group (VORG), with offices at the Steward Observatory of the University of Arizona in Tucson, Arizona.

D.K.J. O'Connell produced the first color photographs of a green flash at sunset in 1960. In 1993, VORG completed construction of the  Vatican Advanced Technology Telescope, which is at Mount Graham near Safford, Arizona.

The Observatory's headquarters remain in Italy at Castel Gandolfo. In early 2008, the Vatican announced that the Observatory would be relocated to a former convent a mile away from the castle as part of a general reconstruction of the Papal residence. Its former space would be used to provide more room for the reception of diplomatic visitors. The old quarters in the castle were cramped and very poorly laid out for the Observatory's use. VORG research activities in Arizona continued unaffected.

Leadership
George Coyne (1978 – 19 August 2006)
José Gabriel Funes (19 August 2006 – 18 September 2015)
Guy Consolmagno (18 September 2015 – present)

See also
Archaeoastronomy
Catholic Church and science#Vatican Observatory
Scientific Perspectives on Divine Action
Vatican Advanced Technology Telescope
 List of astronomical observatories
 List of Jesuit sites

Notes

References
Sabino Maffeo: The Vatican Observatory. In the Service of Nine Popes, Vatican Observatory Publications, 2001.

External links

Astronomical observatories in Italy
Holy See
Catholic Church and science